Potassium silicate is the name for a family of inorganic compounds.  The most common potassium silicate has the formula K2SiO3, samples of which contain varying amounts of water.  These are white solids or colorless solutions.

Synthesis, structure, reactions
Potassium silicate can be synthesized in the laboratory by treating silica with potassium hydroxide, according to this idealized equation:
\mathit{n}{SiO2} + 2KOH -> K2O.\mathit{n}{SiO2} + H2O
These solutions are highly alkaline.  Addition of acids causes the reformation of silica.

K2SiO3 adopts a chain or cyclic structures with interlinked SiO32− monomers.  Each Si is tetrahedral.

Uses

Woodwork protection against fire
Impregnation of wood with a potassium silicate solution is an easy and low cost way for rendering the woodwork of houses secure against catching fire. The woodwork is first saturated with a diluted and nearly neutral solution of potash silicate. After drying, one or two coats of a more concentrated solution are usually applied.

Horticulture
In horticulture, potassium silicate is used as a soluble source of potassium and silica. It makes the growing medium more alkaline.

It is also used as a supplement (in conjunction with normal fertilizer) for the numerous benefits that increasing the availability of silicon compounds has.  Silicon-containing compounds are valuable to a plant, and serve to support the plant. Stems thicken, the plant becomes more tolerant to drought and resists wilting, and the plant gets larger leaves and fruit (because the stem can support more weight). The thicker cell walls of the plant also provides an added mechanical resistance to sap sucking insects (e.g. spider mite) and various pathogenic fungi (e.g. powdery mildew).

Industrial uses
Some metal cleaning formulations use potassium silicate, which also serves as a corrosion inhibitor. It also finds various uses in the fabrication of welding rods or even of cosmetics.

Safety
Potassium silicate is strongly alkaline.

See also
 Sodium silicate
 Silica gel

References

External links

Inorganic silicon compounds
Potassium compounds
Silicates
Glass compositions